"Treat You Right" is a song by American recording artist Luther Vandross. It was one of two new songs along with "Here and Now", both featured on Vandross' first greatest hit's compilation The Best of Luther Vandross... The Best of Love. "Treat You Right" was released as a single in support of the album and was an R&B hit when it peaked at No. 5 in February 1990 on Billboard's Hot R&B Singles Chart.

Critical reception
Bill Coleman from Billboard wrote, "Percolating new-jack-inspired percussion handily supports the soul master's reliably potent vocals on this new cut from his hits compilation. Proper remixes could transform this into a club smash."

Track listing
US, UK Single 
US Vinyl 7", Single
"Treat You Right" (Edit Single) - 3:35
"I Know You Want To" - 4:24  

UK CD Single
"Treat You Right" (Edit Single) - 3:35
"Treat You Right" (LP Version) - 6:37
"The Glow of Love" - 6:11

Charts

References

External links
 www.luthervandross.com

1989 songs
Luther Vandross songs
1990 singles
Songs written by Luther Vandross
Songs written by Marcus Miller
Epic Records singles